Digahoba (also, Digyakhoba) is a village and the least populous municipality in the Khachmaz Rayon of Azerbaijan.  It has a population of 217.

References 

Populated places in Khachmaz District